Yvette Alde (June 28, 1911 – October 30, 1967) was a French painter, lithographer, and Illustrator. She belongs to the School of Paris.

Biography 
Alde studied at the Académie de la Grande Chaumière, where her teachers were :fr:Charles Picart Le Doux and André Lhote. She debuted in the Paris Salon in 1933. Her first solo exhibition was in December 1935 in Barcelona. In August 1946, she married Max Cogniat.

Alde lived in the cité Montmartre-aux-artistes building in Montmartre.  She died in October 1967, and is buried in the 30th division of the Montmartre Cemetery.

Collections 
 Centre national des arts plastiques
 Musée Carnavalet, Paris, Kermesse aux étoiles dans le  jardin des Tuileries, 1955
 Musée d'art et d'histoire de Cognac, Le jugement de Pâris
 Musée Hébert
 Museum of Art in Łódź
 Musée d'art moderne de la ville de Paris
 Princeton University Art Museum
 Tel Aviv Museum of Art

References 

1911 births
1967 deaths
20th-century French women artists
20th-century French painters
Alumni of the Académie de la Grande Chaumière
Burials at Montmartre Cemetery
French women painters
Painters from Paris